This is a list of players, past and present, who have been capped by their country in international football whilst playing for Al-Duhail Sports Club. From nine countries from three continents and the first continental tournament in which players from Al-Duhail SC participated was the 2011 AFC Asian Cup: Khalid Muftah with Qatar and Jasur Hasanov with Uzbekistan, in the 2015 AFC Asian Cup with his domination of local championships, On 23 December 2014, manager Djamel Belmadi chose his 23-man squad, including 5 players from Al-Duhail SC they are Mohammed Musa, Ismaeel Mohammad, Tresor Kangambu, Karim Boudiaf and Khalid Muftah for the second time. but it was a disastrous participation, as Qatar national team was defeated in all its matches to be eliminated from the group stage. The South Korea national team included Nam Tae-hee in his first participation in the AFC Asian Cup, where he achieved the runner-up after losing in the final against Australia. In 2019 AFC Asian Cup, the Qatari national team excelled and achieved the surprise by winning the title after winning the final against Japan. Five players from Al-Duhail SC were included in the squad. Almoez Ali won the tournament's top scorer title with nine goals, including four against North Korea, Ali and Bassam Al-Rawi were in Team of the tournament.

Players

Qatari players

Foreign players

Players in international competitions

Asian Cup Players
  
 

2011 Asian Cup
  Khalid Muftah
  Jasur Hasanov

2015 Asian Cup
  Mohammed Musa
  Khalid Muftah
  Ismaeel Mohammad
  Tresor Kangambu
  Karim Boudiaf
  Nam Tae-hee

2019 Asian Cup
  Karim Boudiaf
  Bassam Al-Rawi
  Almoez Ali
  Ali Afif
  Assim Madibo

African Cup, Copa América, Gold Cup, Players
  
 

2019 Copa América
  Abdullah Al-Ahrak
  Karim Boudiaf
  Bassam Al-Rawi
  Almoez Ali
  Ali Afif
  Assim Madibo

2021 CONCACAF Gold Cup
  Mohammed Muntari
  Karim Boudiaf
  Bassam Al-Rawi
  Almoez Ali
  Abdullah Al-Ahrak
  Assim Madibo

World Cup Players

2022 FIFA World Cup
  Mohammed Muntari
  Karim Boudiaf
  Bassam Al-Rawi
  Ismaeel Mohammad
  Almoez Ali
  Assim Madibo

References

External links
National Football Teams

Lekhwiya SC
 
Al-Duhail SC international
Association football player non-biographical articles
Lists of international association football players by club